Hansle Parchment (born 17 June 1990) is a Jamaican track and field athlete, competing in the 110 metres hurdles. He is the reigning Olympic champion in the event.

Parchment is an alumnus of the University of the West Indies, Kingston and won a gold medal at the 2011 Summer Universiade, running a then-personal best of 13.24 to win the title for Jamaica.

In June 2012, he won the Jamaican Olympic trials in a then-personal best of 13.18 to qualify for the Jamaican team at the 2012 Summer Olympics. On 8 August 2012, Parchment won the bronze medal in the final of the 110 m hurdles. He ran a then-Jamaican record of 13.12 to clinch third place, behind Aries Merritt and Jason Richardson.

At the 2015 World Championships in Beijing, Parchment took the silver medal in the final of the 110 m hurdles. In a high-quality field consisting of world record holder and Olympic Champion Aries Merritt, defending champion David Oliver, and European champion Sergey Shubenkov, Parchment was beaten only by the Shubenkov, running a time of 13.03.

In June 2021, Parchment placed third at the Jamaican Olympic trials with a time of 13.18 to qualify for the 2020 Summer Olympics. In the final of the 110 m hurdles at the Olympic Games, he won the gold medal with a time of 13.04, beating Grant Holloway and Ronald Levy.

Competition record

1Did not start in the final

References

External links

1990 births
Living people
Jamaican male sprinters
Jamaican male hurdlers
People from Saint Thomas Parish, Jamaica
Athletes (track and field) at the 2010 Commonwealth Games
Athletes (track and field) at the 2018 Commonwealth Games
Athletes (track and field) at the 2012 Summer Olympics
Olympic athletes of Jamaica
Olympic bronze medalists for Jamaica
University of the West Indies alumni
Medalists at the 2012 Summer Olympics
World Athletics Championships athletes for Jamaica
World Athletics Championships medalists
Olympic bronze medalists in athletics (track and field)
Universiade medalists in athletics (track and field)
Commonwealth Games medallists in athletics
Commonwealth Games silver medallists for Jamaica
Universiade gold medalists for Jamaica
Medalists at the 2011 Summer Universiade
Athletes (track and field) at the 2020 Summer Olympics
Medalists at the 2020 Summer Olympics
Olympic gold medalists for Jamaica
Olympic gold medalists in athletics (track and field)
20th-century Jamaican people
21st-century Jamaican people
Medallists at the 2018 Commonwealth Games